The Żurrieq Scottish Airlines crash was an air accident that happened on 18 February 1956. A Scottish Airlines Avro York crashed after takeoff from Luqa Airport in Malta on a trooping flight from the Suez Canal Zone to London Stansted Airport. The disaster killed all 50 passengers and crew on board the aircraft; all passengers except one (a British Army private) were Royal Air Force personnel.

Accident
The accident happened on 18 February 1956 when the Avro York, registration G-ANSY, took off from Luqa Airport, Malta at 12:21 UTC time on a flight to London Stansted Airport with 45 passengers and five crew aboard. Shortly after becoming airborne, the boost enrichment capsule in the carburetor of the number one engine failed, and the engine caught fire. The pilots failed to feather the propeller as the aircraft slowly climbed to 700–800 feet; they then made a left turn to return to the airport. Shortly after retracting the flaps, the aircraft went into a nose-up attitude at very low speed.  This resulted in a stall, which caused the aircraft to enter an unrecoverable dive. It crashed into the ground near the town of Żurrieq killing all 50 passengers and crew on board.

Cause
The reported mechanical cause was failure of the number one engine. However, this was compounded by a loss of speed and consequent loss of control through pilot error.

Memorials 
There is memorial at the National Memorial Arboretum, a British site of national remembrance at Alrewas, near Lichfield, Staffordshire. Another memorial is located at Il-Ġibjun Gardens in Żurrieq, Malta, close to the crash site.

References

External links

Aviation-safety.net report of the accident
British Pathe newsreel about the crash

Scottish Airlines accidents and incidents
Aviation accidents and incidents in Malta
Aviation accidents and incidents in 1956
Accidents and incidents involving the Avro York
1956 in Malta
Żurrieq
February 1956 events in Europe